The Cindy Margolis Show is a (2000) television show filmed in Miami Beach, Florida, and hosted by Cindy Margolis.  The premise of the show was to have a lot of young people party and dance around a stage on which various events took place such as bikini contests.  The show was hosted by Margolis and Lance Krall with DJ Skribble providing dance music for the party goers.

Episode list 
Luau	 8/18/2000		
Pajama Party	 8/25/2000		
Disco	 9/1/2000		
The Big Show	 9/8/2000		
The King vs the Queen	 9/15/2000		
Frat Party	 9/22/2000		
Drag Night	 9/29/2000		
Bachelor Party	 10/6/2000		
T&A	 10/13/2000		
Ladies' Night	 10/20/2000		
Halloween Party	 10/27/2000		
Out of This World	 11/3/2000		
Springer Break	 11/10/2000		
Big Pimpin'	 11/17/2000		
Thanksgiving Party	 11/24/2000

References

External links 

Television series by CBS Studios
2000s American music television series
First-run syndicated television programs in the United States
Television shows set in Florida
2000 American television series debuts
2000 American television series endings
UPN original programming